Peter Levashov is a Russian spammer and virus creator. He is suspected by The Spamhaus Project of being one of the longest operating criminal spam-lords on the internet.

Background

Levashov is known by Spamhaus for his involvement with many other Eastern European and U.S. based botnet spammers. He was a partner of American spammer Alan Ralsky. Peter Levashov was arrested by Spanish officials while in Barcelona, at the request of the United States Department of Justice. He is suspected by the United States of being the mastermind behind the Kelihos botnet and was extradited to the United States, arriving on 2 February 2018. Russia had filed a competing extradition request.

The case was U.S. v. Levashov, 17-mj-448, U.S. District Court, District of Connecticut (Bridgeport)., assigned to Robert N. Chatigny, Senior United States District Judge in Hartford. Levashov pleaded not guilty to the charges. According to his lawyer, Petya [Pyotr] Levashov was detained in the Bridgeport, Connecticut prison until at least 5 February 2018. Levashov, who cooperated with the FBI during his imprisonment, was released in 2021 with his sentence reduced to time served (33 months.)

An affidavit unsealed on February 5, 2018, showed Apple’s unexpected role in bringing the Russian spam king to justice. Peter Levashov allegedly ran the Kelihos botnet under the alias “Severa,” renting out access to spammers and other cybercriminals. Despite Levashov’s significant efforts at anonymity, court records show that federal agents had been surveilling his iCloud account since May 20, 2016, funneling back crucial information that may have led to his arrest.

See also 
 Kelihos botnet

References

Living people
Spammers
1980 births